Cops (stylized as COPS) is an American television documentary reality legal programming television series that is currently in its 34th season. It is produced by Langley Productions. It premiered on the Fox network on March 11, 1989. The series, known for chronicling the lives of police officers, follows city police officers and sheriff's deputies, sometimes backed up by state police or other state agencies, during patrol, calls for service, and other police activities including prostitution and narcotic stings, and occasionally the serving of search/arrest warrants at criminal residences. Some episodes have also featured federal agencies. The show's formula follows the cinéma vérité convention, which does not consist of any narration, scripted dialogue or incidental music/added sound effects, depending entirely on the commentary of the officers and on the actions of the people with whom they come into contact, giving the audience a fly on the wall point of view. Each episode typically consists of three self-contained segments which often ended with one or more arrests.

It is one of the longest-running television shows in the United States and, in May 2011, it became the longest-running show on Fox (since then, its duration has been surpassed by the duration of The Simpsons). It also became the longest running live action series on Fox, after America's Most Wanted was canceled after 23 years (that show's host, John Walsh, also appeared on Cops many times). In 2013, the program moved to Spike TV, now known as Paramount Network.

In late 2007, during the premiere of its 20th season, episodes of Cops began broadcasting in widescreen, though not in high definition. In June 2020, Paramount Network pulled the show from its schedule in response to George Floyd protests following his murder while in the custody of the Minneapolis Police Department, and announced its cancellation days later. The show remains in production for its international and overseas partners, and began to film anew in Spokane County, Washington, with its sheriff's department in October 2020. In September 2021, it was announced that Fox Nation picked up the show. The 33rd season premiered on October 1, 2021. The show's 34th season premiered on September 30, 2022.

History
Cops was created by John Langley and Malcolm Barbour, who tried unsuccessfully for several years to get a network to carry the program. When the 1988 Writers Guild of America strike forced them to find other kinds of programming, the young Fox Television network picked up the low-cost Cops, which had no union writers.

The program premiered on Fox on March 11, 1989. When the show went primetime in 1991, and consisted of two episodes in the 8 p.m. hour, it was called Primetime Cops in promos for several years. The program was one of only two remaining first-run prime-time programs airing on Saturday nights on the four major U.S. broadcast television networks (along with CBS's 48 Hours Mystery). Malcolm Barbour left from producing Cops in 1994.

For the first 25 seasons, Cops was broadcast by Fox with reruns of earlier seasons syndicated by local television stations and cable networks, including truTV and G4. After Fox canceled the show in May 2013, Spike picked it up for an additional five seasons, in addition to reruns of previous seasons. The 30th season premiered on June 17, 2017.

On August 21, 2017, Cops celebrated its 1,000th episode with a live special called Cops: Beyond the Bust, hosted by Terry Crews (who plays a police sergeant in the sitcom Brooklyn Nine-Nine), which included historical clips from the run of the program as well as reunions of officers and the suspects that they arrested. The date of the 1,000th episode also marked a shift of episode premieres from Saturdays to Mondays.

The show follows officers in 140 different cities in the United States, Hong Kong, London, and the Soviet Union.

In the wake of the protests following the murder of George Floyd in Minneapolis, Minnesota under police custody, Paramount Network pulled the series from the air ahead of its season 33 premiere, which was scheduled for June 1, 2020. On June 9, 2020, a network spokesperson announced "Cops is not on the Paramount Network and we don't have any current or future plans for it to return".
The episode "Party in a Box" (season 28, episode 20, originally aired December 12, 2015) featured Atlanta Police Department Officer Garrett Rolfe, who in 2020 was charged with the killing of Rayshard Brooks during a driving under the influence investigation.

In September 2020, Cops resumed production. The new episodes were being produced for international syndication and to fulfill contracts overseas that had not expired; Langley did not secure a domestic distributor until 2021. Rocket Rights picked up the show for distribution outside the United States in early-2021, with Langley's distribution unit, Langley Television Distribution (as of 2021) handling sales in the United States.

On September 13, 2021, it was announced that Fox Nation had picked up the show. The 33rd season premiered on October 1, 2021. Fox Nation would then premiere the show's 34th season on September 30, 2022.

Production 
Cops was created by John Langley and his producing partner Malcolm Barbour. In 1983 they were working on Cocaine Blues, a television series about drugs. As part of his research Langley went on a drug raid with drug enforcement officers and was inspired to create a show focusing on real-life law enforcement. Before that, there had been only a few instances of cinéma vérité productions documenting the work of police officers, such as Roger Graef's Police in 1982.

In the late 1980s, after producing the live syndicated specials American Vice: The Doping of a Nation, Murder: Live From Death Row, and Devil's Worship: Exposing Satan's Underground all with Geraldo Rivera, Langley and Barbour pitched the Cops show concept to Stephen Chao, a Fox programming executive who would one day become president of the Fox Television Stations Group and later USA Network. Chao liked the concept and pitched it to Barry Diller, then Chief Executive Officer of the Fox Network. Malcolm Barbour left from producing Cops in 1994.

A Writers Guild of America strike was occurring at the time and the network needed new material. An unscripted show that did not require writers was ideal for Fox. The first season aired in 1989 and consisted of 15 episodes featuring the Broward County Sheriff's Office. Since then, it has often been one of the highest-rated reality-TV programs, in part due to its low production cost (estimated at US$200,000 per episode in the early 1990s) and thus its capacity to show new material each week.

The original concept of the show was to follow officers home and tape their home lives along with their work. After a while the idea of following officers home was deemed too artificial by Langley and was abandoned. Thereafter, the format of three self-contained unscripted segments without narration or music became the show's formula.

Since the third episode of Season 2, every episode ends with a police radio excerpt referencing the intersection of SE 132nd St. and SE Bush St. in the Powellhurst-Gilbert, Portland, Oregon neighborhood of Portland, Oregon. A female officer says, "132 and Bush, I've got him at gunpoint", and a female dispatcher replies, "132 and Bush. Cover's Code 3." Another woman says, "Units 25, 14 can transmit on Tac 2", and the dispatcher replies, "Okay, we'll still send it Code 3." Then an instrumental version of "Bad Boys" plays over the credits. On the first season of Cops, instead of "132 and Bush, I've got him at gunpoint", it was a police radio excerpt from the Broward County, Florida Sheriff's Office. In the first two episodes of the second season, a different police radio excerpt from the Portland Bureau of Police was used.

Cops aired on Fox's traditional Saturday-night lineup since its debut in 1989. As of 2012, the program retained its traditional time slot, but aired more intermittently as Fox Sports scheduled more sports programming in Saturday-night primetime, with NASCAR on Fox in the late winter and spring, Major League Baseball on Fox throughout the spring and summer, Fox College Football in the fall, and various Fox UFC throughout the year. Cops was then scheduled on weeks without any sporting events, followed by an encore presentation of a Fox drama series.

In 2013, it was announced that Fox had cancelled the program. However, it was later announced that Spike TV had picked up the program for another season. In August 2017, Spike moved the show's time slot to Monday.

Agencies featured

Camera crew involvement 
In one episode, the production sound mixer for the camera crew, a former emergency medical technician, assisted a police officer in performing cardiopulmonary resuscitation (season 2, episode 7).

In an episode in season 11 that took place in 1998 in Atlanta, Georgia, camera operator Si Davis, who was a Las Vegas Metropolitan Police Department reserve police officer, dropped the camera and assisted an Atlanta police officer in wrestling a suspect into custody. It turned out that the APD officer had been severely injured during a foot pursuit; meanwhile, mixing console Steve Kiger picked up the camera and continued recording the action, which eventually made the air.

In another episode, a rape suspect fled and outran officers, only to have the cameraman follow him the entire time, until police caught up to the suspect and subdued him (season 10, episode 19).

In an episode of season 14 (2001–2002), during the arrest of a man after a car chase in Hillsborough County, Florida, the sound mixer held the suspect's sister away from the deputy after she tried to intervene in her brother's arrest.

During the first episode of season 22, which aired on September 12, 2009, an officer with the Las Vegas Metropolitan Police Department was tackled by a suspect high on PCP. The camera operator and Las Vegas Fire Department firefighter/paramedics wrestled the suspect away from the officer.

In episode 17 of season 26 that aired on February 1, 2014, during the arrest of a man in Sacramento, California, for battery on his girlfriend, one of the camera crew pulled one of the suspect's American pit bull terrier away from one of the arresting officers. The dog was biting the officer on the leg after being commanded to do so by the suspect.

During the recording of episode 7 in Season 27, the camera crew assisted in detaining the passenger of a vehicle whose operator had fled on foot from officers in Lafayette, Louisiana. As police chased the driver, who successfully evaded arrest, the camera crew secured the vehicle by giving directions to the passenger; at one point, the camera operator can be seen gesturing to the passenger to place the latter's hands on the dashboard.

2014 Wendy's shooting incident 
On August 26, 2014, at roughly 9:20 p.m., a Cops crew was recording with the Omaha Police Department in Omaha, Nebraska, during their final week working with them since arriving in June. A police officer drove to a Wendy's restaurant during a robbery and called for backup. One of the other responding officers had a two-person Cops crew (a cameraman and audio technician Bryce Dion) present in his or her cruiser. The crew began recording the robbery inside Wendy's.

Authorities later identified the robber as 32-year-old Cortez Washington, whom police shot several times during the shootout. A police officer fired through a window, hitting Dion (wearing a bullet-resistant vest) once under the arm. Medics transported both to the hospital, and both died, with Dion being pronounced dead shortly after arrival.

The 38-year-old Dion had worked on Cops for seven years. Langley Productions stated that, in 25 years of video recording, this was the first incident in which a crew member was seriously injured or killed. A Cops crew working in Springfield, Missouri, also wrapped following the Omaha incident. In Dion's honor, the show aired an hour-long "best of" episode featuring his work on its September 20, 2014 episode.

The robbery's events took only seconds to happen. Detective Darren Cunningham responded to the call while the Cops crew accompanied Officer Brooks Riley and Officer Jason Wilhelm. Cunningham and Riley entered the front door and unholstered their firearms, while Wilhelm went to the restaurant's back part to cover an emergency exit door that opens only from indoors. Cunningham and Riley approached Washington, who was at the restaurant's back part and did not see the officers arrive. For unknown reasons, Washington walked to the front counter, where the officers identified him and told him to lie on the floor—but Washington immediately pointed and fired a pistol while moving toward the officers, who returned fire. Cunningham retreated into the hallway toward the restroom and kept firing at Washington, who had then turned the corner and stood where the officers had initiated contact. Riley moved around a column and into the waiting aisle at the counter. As Washington passed the uniformed police officer, he aimed his weapon toward the officer and continued firing as he moved toward the front exit. Dion was caught in the ensuing crossfire as the officer returned fire at Washington, who stumbled into the parking lot and fell from his injuries before his arrest.

After the scene was secured, authorities learned that Washington's pistol was actually an airsoft handgun that strongly resembled a real Taurus firearm.

Authorities placed the three police officers on paid leave pending the result of an investigation into the shooting. A grand jury acquitted all three of misconduct.

Washington had a lengthy criminal record in Wyandotte County, Kansas. At the time of the Wendy's robbery, he was on parole in Missouri, having been released in September 2013 after serving two years of a seven-year sentence as an accessory to second-degree robbery of a jewelry store, to which he pleaded guilty. In determining sentences and eligibility for parole, Missouri law does not consider criminal records in other states. Approximately 20 minutes before the Wendy's robbery, his 24-year-old girlfriend, Jeneva Arias, robbed a Little Caesars pizza restaurant, using the same airsoft pistol; Washington served as her getaway driver. Arias in turn was to be Washington's getaway driver in the Wendy's robbery, but fled. While in jail awaiting trial, she committed felony assault via throwing a soap mixture into a health care worker's face and fracturing a jailer's hand. Authorities gave Arias a plea bargain, and she pleaded no contest to reduced charges, and they sentenced her to a maximum of six years in jail through concurrent sentencing.

Bryce Dion's brother, Trevor Dion, filed a lawsuit in February 2016 against the City of Omaha, alleging that inadequate communication and coordination between dispatchers and the officers arriving at the scene contributed to Dion's death. The suit also blames the authorities' decision to invite the Cops video crew to go with officers. On April 24, 2018, a Douglas County District Judge refused the City of Omaha's request to bar the release of the video of the robbery-shooting at Wendy's and ordered the City of Omaha to release all materials related to the death of Bryce Dion, of which only still frames had been previously released. On April 25, 2018, the video recorded by the Cops camera crew was released. The video was shown in open court and the Omaha World-Herald requested a copy, which it later released. Trevor Dion's lawsuit against the city was dismissed by a judge in July 2019.

Opening sequence 

The show's theme song is "Bad Boys", performed by reggae group Inner Circle, which was played over a montage of clips.

All episodes of Cops began with a disclaimer. Beginning with later episodes of season 2, the wording was:

The disclaimer in the first two seasons was slightly different: "Cops is filmed on location as it happens. All suspects are considered innocent until proven guilty in a court of law." Burt Lancaster provided the following narration on the pilot episode: "Cops is about real people, and real crime. It was filmed entirely on location, with the men and women who work in law enforcement."

During at least the first season, episodes featured original scoring in a vein similar to the instrumental backing of the opening song. Some cues were short, others longer, usually over montages. Among the composers who scored episodes were Michael Lewis and Nathan Wang.

The Spike/Paramount Network version of the show added the Twitter handle and Facebook URL as its social media pages to the intro in 2013 until it was removed in 2020.

Episodes

Syndication

Domestic
In September 1993, reruns of Cops went into broadcast syndication, and like Fox's fellow series The Simpsons, it became a mainstay of the format, with its carriage being led by Fox Television Stations itself, be it Fox stations or those stations which belong to its sister network MyNetworkTV; it was also consistently included on the schedule of The CW's smaller-market chain of local cable channels and broadcast subchannels, The CW Plus. In the fall of 2013, it mainly began to air on Spike (now Paramount Network) on the cable side as part of that network's agreement to air new episodes, after several years on truTV. Older episodes were picked up by the now defunct Cloo in September 2014, after spending years on the now defunct G4, which was discontinued in December 2014. Local station syndication of the show was prevalent on most Fox stations and affiliates at the time, but as of 2015, older episodes were shifted into Cops Reloaded. WGN America also carried reruns of the regular version. At the start of 2016, the episodes in the now defunct Cloo/G4 package were moved into the Spike/Paramount Network syndicated package when the former G4/Cloo syndication agreement expired, giving that network the rights to the majority of the program. After Viacom's acquisition of Pluto TV in 2019, a 24/7 channel made up of episodes of the series directly programmed under license from Langley Productions was launched.

Related to Paramount ending its carriage of Cops in June 2020, it has also relinquished its syndication rights; WGN America, which began to convert to a general news network as NewsNation under new ownership, also decided to stop carrying the show at the end of its existing carriage contract, which happened to terminate by coincidence on June 30, 2020. Disney Media Distribution, which syndicates the FTSP-era episodes under its former name of 20th Television to local television stations, replaced the series for the remainder of the summer with the 2018–19 run of the defunct syndication version of Who Wants to Be a Millionaire on June 15 (of which an hour of episodes were distributed, as Cops was often paired with Live PD: Police Patrol, which was also pulled from syndication at the same time new episodes of that series were cancelled). Reelz began to carry Reloaded episodes again on September 3, 2021. Reelz also began to carry older episodes of the regular version from seasons 8-17.

International
Cops is broadcast in the UK on CBS Drama, CBS Reality and Fox. In Portugal the show is aired on Fox Crime, in Brazil on truTV, in Colombia on truTV, in Australia on Network Ten, 10 Bold (a sub-channel of Network Ten) and Crime + Investigation, in Japan on Fox Crime, in India on Star World and FOX Crime, in Norway on V4, in Sweden Reloaded airs on TV12 while original runs on TV6 and TV10, and in Denmark on Canal 9.

In Canada, both the original and Reloaded versions of the program aired on Action (now Adult Swim). BiteTV began airing the program in December 2014 (until its relaunch as Makeful in August 2015), while sibling channel RadX (which re-branded to BBC Earth in January 2017) began airing it on Monday, August 3, 2015.

Cops 2.0
An enhanced version of the program branded as Cops 2.0 with live web chats and program facts aired on G4 from May 2007 to 2009.

Cops Reloaded 

In January 2013, 20th Television announced that a new syndicated version titled Cops Reloaded would begin airing on CMT as well as local stations. The new format features slightly edited segments of classic Cops episodes, allowing for four segments per each half-hour episode. This version contains all new graphics and soundbites during the opening theme song, and older segments are modified and framed to a sharpened widescreen image for the high-definition format if they were originated in standard-definition television.

Home media 
The program has had several "best-of" home videos, including Cops: In Hot Pursuit, Cops: Shots Fired, Cops: Bad Girls, and Cops: Caught in the Act which include uncensored "too hot for TV" segments containing profanity and nudity that was edited out of the network version.

A Cops: 20th Anniversary Edition two-disc DVD with viewer favorites from each season, several behind the scenes features, and the original one-hour pilot was released in the United States and Canada on February 19, 2008.

Tie-ins 
In 1994, Pacific Gameworks created a proposal for a video game project intended for the Atari Jaguar based upon the TV show; however, production of the game never started and it was left unreleased.

In 1995, Nova Productions and Atari Games released a LaserDisc arcade game based on the show. The game uses live-action full motion video for graphics and consists of a driving stage and a shooting stage very similar to Mad Dog McCree.

In 1999, Cops associate producer and sound mixer Hank Barr published The Jump-Out Boys, a book about the show's production.

In 2000, The sci-fi series The X-Files created an episode called “X-Cops”, which followed was shot in the style of a normal Cops episode, but dealt with the main characters of X-Files dealing with a shapeshifter.

Reception

Recognition 
Cops has received four Primetime Emmy nominations, as of May 2017. The website of the Academy of Television Arts & Sciences specifically lists four nominations of Cops for Outstanding Informational Series (in 1989, 1990, 1993, and 1994) but ultimately no Emmy awards were awarded to the show.

Awards won have included:
 1993: the American Television Award for Best Reality-Based Program
 2008: American Cinema Editors, USA Eddie (award) for Best Edited Reality Series

Other nominations (not resulting in an award) have included:
 2016: Critics' Choice Television Award for Best Unstructured Reality Show

Criticism 
Even though it is popular and long-running, Cops has drawn mixed reviews, and it has also raised ethical questions.

Positive 

In the show's third year, 1992, Alan Bunce of The Christian Science Monitor praised the show as network television's "only true 'cinema verite' series"—declaring it "innocent of re-enactments," and "free of fancy production effects," while remaining "doggedly faithful to its format."

Bunce raved about its "honesty of tone" and the show's "commitment" to, in his words, "recording exactly what happens" (nothing more, nothing less)—"an implicit rebuke" to what he called "the excesses and sleight-of-hand" indulged in by most other "reality" shows. "Cops", he said, "is a stickler for authenticity."

Negative
In 1999, the Los Angeles Times Pulitzer Prize-winning, long-time, television critic Howard Rosenberg chastised ride-along reality TV shows (like Cops, which he particularly named), as "uniting" police and media in ride-alongs where each party is "an extension of the other." When invading "private property with their cameras rolling," said Rosenberg, these partnerships' behavior is "appallingly indifferent" to the "fundamental privacy rights" of the people whose homes they invade, and the resulting TV shows depict "social and moral crises" deceptively, "without context"—doing so in "the most narrow, emotional terms" they can. In a 2009 interview, Cops executive producer John Langley admitted that his show is built around a three-segment structure, presenting an "action" piece, an "emotional" piece, and a "thought" piece (an example of the rule of three).

Rosenberg further describes such a commercial police–media partnership as exceptionally prone to media corruption—yielding misleading, one-sided perspectives. "The collusion potential is enormous," says Rosenberg, because a so-called "reality" series can choose to air nothing that they fear will put their partners (the police) in a bad light (an embarrassment which, says Rosenberg, would cut off the TV show's access to the ride-alongs, resulting in "no access, no show".)

A podcast called Headlong: Running from Cops started in April 2019. Presented by Dan Taberski, it investigates Cops and Live PD, their alleged treatment of participants and whether scenarios are portrayed truthfully.

Critics have noted the use of propaganda for cops, or copaganda, in the show COPS.

Targeted subjects
2004 Old Dominion study
In June 2004, researchers at Old Dominion University videotaped 16 episodes of Cops and then evaluated them for crime content, and for the race and gender of characters depicted. They found prior studies statistically reinforced in their descriptions of racial misrepresentation on Cops. The study found that, on Cops, African-American men were overwhelmingly shown as perpetrators—usually of violent crimes—and Hispanic men (rarely depicted at all) were also usually depicted as violent criminals. The police officers depicted were overwhelmingly white, and the disproportionately few white offenders were more-often portrayed as involved in non-violent offenses. As a response, the show's co-creator John Langley tried to include white offenders in each episode.

Statistical correlations between actual crime rates and types (by race and gender, as reported by the FBI's Uniform Crime Reports) and the Old Dominion study's analysis of characters in the Cops episodes indicated that the Cops episodes (on average) sharply skewed the numbers, racially, making African-American and Hispanic men appear far more responsible for violent crime than they actually are in the U.S. population at large. At the same time, white males were shown on Cops as a far less culpable group than they actually are, statistically.

The study also noted that women were almost totally ignored in Cops—seldom appearing as either officers or offenders. Finally, it noted that the show overwhelmingly depicted violent crimes, despite such crimes being a distinct minority of crime in the U.S.

2004 Prosise-Johnson study
In 2004, researchers Theodore O. Prosise (Univ. of Wash.), and Ann Johnson, Ph.D. (Univ. of Calif./Long Beach), studied a random, but non-scientific, sample of 81 anecdotes from Cops episodes—analyzing their content, subjects and characters. They concluded that the program was racially skewed, negatively misrepresenting African-Americans, depicted as a criminal class out of proportion to their actual percentage of U.S. crime, in particular.

Moreover, the study indicated that the Cops episodes appeared to selectively edit out failed police efforts, and police-initiated actions "on a hunch" that resulted in the discovery of no grounds for an intervention or arrest—showing only those officer "hunches and suspicions" that were productive—creating the illusion that officer instincts were more reliable and valid than in actual life. The study's authors expressed concern that this provided TV viewers with implicit—and misleading—justification for police actions that amounted to "racism, discrimination or profiling."

Targeting the poor

The show has been criticized for its predominant focus on criminal activities among the poor. Critics of this aspect of the show say it unfairly presents the poor as responsible for most crime in society while ignoring the "white-collar crimes" that are typical of the more wealthy. Controversial documentary filmmaker Michael Moore raises this tenet in an interview with a former associate producer of Cops, Richard Herlan, in Moore's 2002 movie Bowling for Columbine.

Herlan's response to Moore was that television is primarily a visual medium, requiring regular footage on a weekly basis to sustain a show, and police officers "busting in" on an office where identity theft papers are being created or other high-level crime rings are operating does not happen very often. It is therefore not likely to be recorded and thus not shown. The low-level crime featured on the show happens every day, providing large quantities of material suitable for taping.

Influence on viewers
A 2001 study of 117 Justice Studies students at Arizona State University—a cross-section sample proportionally representative of the genders and races of all justice studies students at ASU—found various correlations between students' race and gender and their attitudes towards representative episodes of Cops. The study found that students were drawn to the violence in the program. It also found that students interpreted Cops scenes as valid and informative representations of the genders and races different from their own—eliminating the need to learn about them through direct personal contact.

Rejections by police departments
In 2005 in response to a request for Cops taping, Patrick Camden, the Chicago Police Department's deputy director of news affairs stated, "police work is not entertainment. What they do trivializes policing. We've never seriously even considered taping." The Fairfax County Police Department, located in Northern Virginia, has similarly refused to allow Cops taping since the show originally aired, as have the Washington, D.C. Police, St. Louis City Police, and the Honolulu Police Department. In addition, the show has rarely featured federal law enforcement agencies because such officers often work undercover and as a result, they are not inclined to have their work broadcast.

Influence on the media

Similar shows
Animal Planet aired its own version called Animal Cops, featuring animal control services and animal welfare organizations.

Several other American shows have paid homage to Cops format, such as LAPD: Life on the Beat, Police POV, Live PD and On Patrol: Live.

A similar Canadian series called Under Arrest aired in the 1990s and 2000s.

Parodies
Three Fox series parodied their own network's program. Mad TV featured a series of filmed parodies called "Clops", shot in claymation, and consisted of animated cops and criminals, commonly in exaggerated situations analogous to the real series. In Living Color did a parody called "Thugs", from the point of view of a group of criminals. In 1992, the episode "Homer's Triple Bypass" from The Simpsons featured a parody of the show entitled "COPS: In Springfield".

Seattle's sketch comedy show Almost Live! did a parody called "Librarians", and "Cops in...".

In 1994, children's show Bill Nye the Science Guy did a parody called "Cops in Your Bloodstream", with said 'police officers' representing white blood cells attempting to stop 'criminal' infections.

Troops is a mockumentary by Kevin Rubio that had its debut at San Diego Comic-Con International on July 18, 1997, and was subsequently distributed via the internet. The movie is a parody of Cops, set in the Star Wars universe. In the movie, Imperial stormtroopers from the infamous Black Sheep Squadron patrolling the Dune Sea on the planet Tatooine run into some very familiar characters while being recorded for the hit Imperial TV show Troops.

Shrek 2 had a clip of a parody show called Knights which showed Shrek, Donkey, and Puss in Boots being arrested (the latter for possession of catnip).

On January 28, 2019, The Late Show with Stephen Colbert did a parody called Mueller which featured CNN's footage of Roger Stone's arrest the previous week, with footage of other Donald Trump associates' arrests mixed into actual Cops opening titles, and a fictional FBI agent providing recaps of the action.

Jay Leno parodied the program on The Tonight Show in the mid-90s, which included rewrites of the theme song with various insults, including "dumb cops", "short cops" and "mall cops", with appropriate characters and changed lyrics.

Two episodes of the sitcom My Name Is Earl had the main characters being arrested during (fictitious) tapings of Cops.

The Dead or Alive video game series had a parody show called Agents which showed the man being arrested by government agents for torturing and abusing his ex-girlfriends, grifting, fraud, movie piracy, TV episode piracy, impersonating now-deceased Fame Douglas, mocked and impersonated on Helena Douglas on the internet and forging his own video game and sent to federal prison.

The upcoming untitled Oddworld film had a parody show called Police which Sligs, Vykkers, Interns, Outlaws, Wolvarks and Gloktigi attempts to track down and arrest Abe and Munch.

The X-Files pseudo-crossover episode

The show The X-Files released a pseudo crossover episode of Cops called "X-Cops" (season 7, episode 12) in which FBI Special Agents Fox Mulder and Dana Scully collaborate with mostly fictional deputies from the Los Angeles County Sheriff's Department (an actual LASD SWAT team was also featured in the episode) in order to catch a mysterious, shapeshifting entity. In the tradition of the real-life Cops program, the entire episode is shot on video.

Legal issues

Home intrusion 

A 1999 United States Supreme Court decision, Wilson v. Layne, No. 98-83, (and the Court's simultaneous stance on an Appeals Court ruling in a similar case Hanlon v. Berger, No. 97-1927, and its affiliate case, CNN v. Berger, No. 97-1914) appeared to legal scholars to restrict the actions of Cops video crews, and some suggested it might even spell the end for the program.

In the Wilson case, a reporter and photographer from The Washington Post accompanied a federal marshal (Layne) and local officials when the authorities entered a home (of the Wilson family) acting on a search warrant. The Supreme Court ruled that law enforcement officers may not bring a media ride-along guest with them when entering a private home to execute a search warrant, stating that it was a violation of the Fourth Amendment rights of the people in the home to be "free from unreasonable searches and seizures," and to be "secure in their persons, houses, papers and effects." The court affirmed (or reaffirmed, in some views) the policy that officers may not bring into the home with them people whose role was not in the direct service of the purpose of the warrant. Though that court — by its own admission (stated in the majority opinion document) — was usually divided on Fourth Amendment issues, the court ruled unanimously in this case that the authorities' accommodation of the media intrusion violated the Fourth Amendment.

The court further ruled that officers violating that ruling, and allowing unnecessary parties to invade with them, were liable to those in the home they had entered, and could be sued for damages. The lone dissent on that element of the case was on the question of current liability (Justice Stevens believed that the officers in that specific case were liable—but the rest of the court agreed to give them qualified immunity, because the justices believed that the Supreme Court had not yet made its position sufficiently clear on that issue; however, any subsequent violators would be held liable by the court).

The American Civil Liberties Union (ACLU), the organization most associated with defending the Bill of Rights, and whose local affiliate represented the Wilson plaintiffs, took an even more sweeping view in favor of the plaintiffs, preferring the Fourth Amendment privacy protections against any potential First Amendment "freedom of the press" issue in that case.

In the Hanlon case, the Supreme Court further extended the protections of their Wilson ruling to include not only the house of the plaintiffs, but also the curtilage—the enclosed and concealed-from-public-view, private space around the house (commonly including yard, carport and/or garage).

However, Cops executive producer John Langley said the show would continue to be produced, in the following season, in the format of "a pure ride-along show"claiming that the show had always gotten releases from anybody shown on camera, even those people depicted under arrest. (However, Langley's statement did not indicate whether the releases were gained before or after recording, and did not indicate whether some subjects had been videoed without giving their consent, and then simply not been shown"involved"in the resulting program.) Further, Langley noted, most of what the show depicts occurs in "the street or in cars".

Impact on the Dalia Dippolito case 

Cops dedicated an entire episode ("Smooth Criminal", season 24, episode 3, originally aired September 24, 2011) to the case of call girl/escort Delilah "Dalia" Dippolito of Boynton Beach, Florida, who was accused of solicitation to commit first-degree murder after being secretly videotaped hiring a hitman (who was actually an undercover cop) to kill her husband in 2009. At trial, her defense attorney claimed that Dippolito was tricked into signing the Cops release form. The defense attorney also claimed that her husband orchestrated the plot to get aired on Cops. In truth, Cops producers were outraged when investigators persuaded Dippolito to sign the release form before they questioned her, believing that since it was done under color of law, it would be useless. They later convinced Dippolito to sign a second waiver, saying they would give her a chance to tell her side of the story.

Ultimately, both defenses failed, and Dippolito was convicted and sentenced to 20 years in prison. However, the state's Fourth Circuit Court of Appeals ordered a new trial in 2014, finding that the judge at the first trial erred by not doing enough to ensure that jurors weren't improperly exposed to pre-trial publicity. The appeals court found that the judge should have questioned the jurors individually, rather than as a group, regarding how much they knew about the case. It also found that the judge should have dismissed the entire jury when one prospective juror revealed she had read about Dippolito's attempt at poisoning her husband. She was later released on an appeal to the Fourth Circuit Court of Appeals, pending a retrial on May 23, 2016. On August 17, 2016, the appeals court rejected her appeal without comment.

Her retrial began with jury selection on December 1, 2016. The jury was unable to reach a unanimous verdict and a mistrial was declared on December 14, 2016. A second retrial was scheduled to start in June 2017. On June 16, 2017, she was convicted. She faced up to 20 years in prison when sentenced on July 21, 2017. Judge Glenn Kelley ordered her held without bail. Her defense attorneys said they would appeal the verdict. On July 21, 2017, Dippolito was sentenced to 16 years in prison.

The Dippolito case has also been featured on ABC's 20/20, NBC's Dateline, CNBC's American Greed, and the syndicated show distributed by Warner Bros. Domestic Television Distribution, Crime Watch Daily.

Use of Cops videos by defense attorneys
Cops videos have been subpoenaed and used by defense attorneys, resulting in the suppression of evidence owing to police misconduct which was revealed in the Cops videos.

In 2015, "late at night in a high-crime area," a Fort Myers, Florida, police officer—accompanied by a Cops video crew—stopped and frisked a man who was wearing dark clothing and walking in the middle of the street. In an encounter that only lasted 23 seconds, the officer discovered that the suspect (who turned out to be a convicted felon) had a gun, and the suspect was arrested. In subsequent criminal proceedings, in federal district court, the defendant moved to suppress the frisk-acquired gun evidence on the ground that the officer violated the defendant's Fourth Amendment right to be free from unreasonable searches and seizures—arguing that the officer did not have "reasonable suspicion" to frisk him. More specifically, the defendant argued that the officer did not believe, reasonably, that his safety was threatened—nor the safety of others—before conducting the pat-down. The officer countered that the defendant had exhibited suspicious behavior that justified the frisk. Relying heavily on the "indisputable video evidence" that contradicted the officer's testimony on multiple points, the judge agreed with the defense, and barred the evidence of the handgun. Further, the judge suggested that the officer may have altered his original report after viewing the Cops video.

At least one academic reviewer of the case described it as raising questions about how often such police actions are illegal, but unprovable—describing it as a strong justification for requiring police officers to wear body cameras.

Film adaptation 
According to a 2016 report in Deadline Hollywood, Ruben Fleischer was attached to a feature adaptation of Cops as an edgy narrative feature with a buddy comedy bent on the order of Lethal Weapon with Fleischer co-producing the film with David Bernad through The District along with Cops rights holder Langley Films' John Langley. Cameron Fay was to write the script, with Boies/Schiller Film Group providing financing.

See also 
 Law enforcement in the United States
 America's Most Wanted
 Live PD

References

External links 

 
 
 

1989 American television series debuts
1980s American crime television series
1990s American crime television series
2000s American crime television series
2010s American crime television series
2020s American crime television series
1980s American reality television series
1990s American reality television series
2000s American reality television series
2010s American reality television series
2020s American reality television series
English-language television shows
Fox Broadcasting Company original programming
Paramount Network original programming
Spike (TV network) original programming
Documentary television series about policing
Law enforcement in the United States
Television series by 20th Century Fox Television
American television series revived after cancellation